Kalabera is a small village on the northern side of Saipan, Northern Mariana Islands. 

The village is best known for Kalabera Cave, that is a common tourist stop.  The entry room stands close to 60 feet high, and drops off to a seemingly bottomless series of tributaries.  Kalabera is associated with many colonial stories, including being used as a prison for Chamorros during Spain's colonial period and a reputed officers "recreation club" during the Japanese military occupation.

References

Towns and villages in the Northern Mariana Islands